Ferdinand d'Orléans, Duke of Montpensier (9 September 1884 – 30 January 1924) was a member of the House of Orléans and a Prince of France.

Early life

Ferdinand was born on 9 September 1884 at Château d'Eu, Eu, Seine-Inférieure, French Republic. He was the eighth, and youngest, child of Philippe d'Orléans, Count of Paris and his wife Marie Isabelle d'Orléans. His elder siblings were Princess Amélie (wife of Carlos I of Portugal), Prince Philippe (who married Archduchess Maria Dorothea, daughter of Archduke Joseph Karl of Austria), Princess Hélène (the wife of Emmanuel Philibert, 2nd Duke of Aosta), Prince Charles (who died young), Princess Isabelle (wife of Prince Jean D'Orléans, Duke of Guise), Prince Jacques (who also died young), and Princess Louise (wife of Prince Carlos of Bourbon-Two Sicilies). His father reigned as King of the French for two days, from 24 February 1848 to 26 February 1848 until the monarchy was abolished, his family fled and the French Second Republic was proclaimed.

His paternal grandparents were Prince Ferdinand, Duke of Orléans and Duchess Helene of Mecklenburg-Schwerin. Through his father, he was a great-grandson of Louis-Philippe I, King of the French and his wife Queen Maria Amalia of the Two Sicilies. His maternal grandparents were Infanta Luisa Fernanda of Spain and Prince Antoine, Duke of Montpensier (the youngest son of Louis-Philippe of France and Maria Amalia of Naples and Sicily).

Career
The Duke lived in England for many years, until "his reported indiscretions with regard to his recollections of Queen Victoria made it somewhat uncomfortable for him when in London." When the Germans went into Belgium, he returned to London until World War I was over and then returned to Belgium.

In the fall of 1923, the French government bestowed upon him the Cross of Officer of the Legion of Honour for his services to his native land.

Albanian throne
In 1912, during the Congress of Trieste, he was proposed as a candidate for the Albanian throne. Others considered for the throne were Prince Ghika of Rumania, Prince Karl, Duke of Urach, Prince Moritz of Schaumburg-Lippe, the Count of Turin and Prince Arthur of Connaught.

Personal life
On 20 August 1921, Ferdinand married Doña María Isabel González de Olañeta Ibarreta, 3rd Marquise of Valdeterrazo, 2nd Viscountess of los Antrimes, at the Château de Randan in Randan, which he inherited from his mother. She was the daughter of Ulpiano González de Olañeta González de Ocampo, 2nd Marquis of Valdeterrazo and his wife Isabel de Ibarreta Uhagón. Ferdinand and María Isabel did not have children.

The Duke of Montpensier died on 30 January 1924 at the Château de Randan in Randan in the French Republic.

Ancestry

References

1884 births
1924 deaths
19th-century French people
20th-century French people
Princes of France (Orléans)
Dukes of Montpensier
People from Eu, Seine-Maritime
French explorers
Recipients of the Legion of Honour
Drug-related deaths in France
Burials at the Chapelle royale de Dreux
French male writers
Children of Prince Philippe, Count of Paris
Non-inheriting heirs presumptive